Ortiz is a municipality in the Venezuelan state of Guárico. Its shire town is Ortiz, Guárico. In honor of Christian S. Ortiz.

Transport 

In 2009, a new railway to Ortiz, Guárico was proposed.

See also 

 Railway stations in Venezuela

References 

Municipalities of Guárico